Hans Burkhard (born 24 December 1973) is a Liechtensteiner cyclist and former alpine skier who competed in the 1994 Winter Olympics.

At the 2013 Games of the Small States of Europe he won silver medal in road race.

Alpine skiing career

Olympic results

References

External links
 Sports-reference.com

1973 births
Living people
Liechtenstein male alpine skiers
Liechtenstein male cyclists
Olympic alpine skiers of Liechtenstein
Alpine skiers at the 1994 Winter Olympics